Tess Haubrich is an Australian actress and model who most recently played Heather in the 2022 Netflix sci-fi film Spiderhead.

Early life and education
Haubrich was born on 1 April 1990 in Sydney, New South Wales. She was educated at Pittwater High School and SCECGS Redlands. 

Haubrich spent her late teens as a fashion model in Australia, Hong Kong, France and Germany. She trained for two years at the Actors Centre Australia, a private drama school in Sydney, where she trained in theatre.

Career
In 2009, she appeared in two episodes of the soap opera Home and Away as Catie Merrin. She returned to the series as a different character, Shandi Palmer, in 2014.

Haubrich has appeared in a number of major international productions filmed in Australia, including minor roles in The Wolverine (2013) and  Infini (2015); as Private Sarah Rosenthal in Alien: Covenant, and as Woman in Black in the Jackie Chan film Bleeding Steel, both in 2017.

In late 2017, she had a leading role in the second season of Wolf Creek. In 2018, she played a key character in the Australian spy drama series Pine Gap.

Filmography

Film

Television

References

External links 

1990 births
Living people
21st-century Australian actresses
Actresses from Sydney
Australian female models
Models from Sydney